Little Big Shots  (also known as LBS) is an American variety television series co-created and produced by Steve Harvey and Ellen DeGeneres. The series features children demonstrating talents and engaging in conversation with the host.

The series was ordered by NBC in May 2015 for an eight-episode first season, which premiered on March 8, 2016 with Steve Harvey as host. On March 14, 2016, NBC renewed the series for a second season, which premiered on March 5, 2017. The series was renewed for a third season, which premiered on March 18, 2018. A special holiday episode aired on December 12, 2018. In May 2019, nearly a year after the third season finished airing, it was announced that the series had been renewed for a fourth season and that Melissa McCarthy would be replacing Harvey as the new host. The fourth season premiered on February 24, 2020.

Episodes

Season 1 (2016)

Season 2 (2017)

Season 3 (2018)
{{Episode table |background= #990000 |overall =|season = |title = |titleR =|airdate = |prodcode = |viewers = |country = U.S. |episodes = 

{{Episode list
 |EpisodeNumber   = 25
 |EpisodeNumber2  = 3
 |Title           = Eggcellent Eggsperiment
 |OriginalAirDate = 
 |ProdCode        = 303
 |Viewers         = 5.97<ref name="3.03">{{cite web|url=http://tvbythenumbers.zap2it.com/daily-ratings/sunday-final-ratings-march-18-2018/|archive-url=https://web.archive.org/web/20180320164316/http://tvbythenumbers.zap2it.com/daily-ratings/sunday-final-ratings-march-18-2018/|url-status=dead|archive-date=March 20, 2018|title=NCIS: LA' and 'Bob's Burgers' adjust up, 'Instinct,' 'Simpsons' and 'Deception' down: Sunday final ratings|work=TV by the Numbers|last=Porter|first=Rick|date=March 27, 2018|access-date=March 27, 2018}}</ref>
 |ShortSummary    = 
 |LineColor       = #990000
}}

}}

Special (2018)

 Season 4 (2020) 

Reception
Ratings
The series premiered as a "preview" after The Voice with more than 12 million viewers, it then premiered in its regular Sunday at 8:00 PM timeslot on March 13, 2016 and it proved to be a hit for NBC with more than 15 million viewers.

 Forever Young 
In September 2016, NBC ordered a senior-focused spin-off, Little Big Shots: Forever Young, which premiered on June 21, 2017 and aired for 6 episodes.

Awards and nominations

International versions
The international rights are distributed by Warner Bros. International Television Production.Format created by Twenty Twenty Production Limited.

See also
 Steve Harvey's Big Time Challenge''

References

External links
 
 

2016 American television series debuts
2020 American television series endings
2010s American reality television series
2010s American variety television series
2020s American reality television series
2020s American variety television series
English-language television shows
NBC original programming
Talent shows
Television series by Warner Horizon Television
Television series created by Ellen DeGeneres
Television series by A Very Good Production
Television series about children
Television series about teenagers
Non-American television series based on American television series
Television shows remade overseas